Brigitte Anne-Marie Bardot (born 28 September 1934), often referred to by her initials B.B., is a French former actress, singer and model. Famous for portraying sexually emancipated characters with hedonistic lifestyles, she was one of the best known sex symbols of the 1950s and 1960s. Although she withdrew from the entertainment industry in 1973, she remains a major popular culture icon.

Born and raised in Paris, Bardot was an aspiring ballerina in her early life. She started her acting career in 1952. She achieved international recognition in 1957 for her role in And God Created Woman (1956), and also caught the attention of French intellectuals. She was the subject of Simone de Beauvoir's 1959 essay The Lolita Syndrome, which described her as a "locomotive of women's history" and built upon existentialist themes to declare her the first and most liberated woman of post-war France. She won a 1961 David di Donatello Best Foreign Actress Award for her work in The Truth. Bardot later starred in Jean-Luc Godard's film Le Mépris (1963). For her role in Louis Malle's film Viva Maria! (1965) she was nominated for the BAFTA Award for Best Foreign Actress.

Bardot retired from the entertainment industry in 1973. She had acted in 47 films, performed in several musicals, and recorded more than 60 songs. She was awarded the Legion of Honour in 1985. After retiring, she became an animal rights activist and created the Fondation Brigitte Bardot. Bardot is known for her strong personality, outspokenness, and speeches on animal defence; she has been fined twice for public insults. She has also been a controversial political figure, having been fined five times for inciting racial hatred when she criticised immigration and Islam in France. She is married to Bernard d'Ormale, a former adviser to Jean-Marie Le Pen, a French far-right politician. Bardot is a member of the Global 500 Roll of Honour of the United Nations Environment Programme and has received awards from UNESCO and PETA. Los Angeles Times Magazine ranked her second on the "50 Most Beautiful Women In Film".

Early life
Bardot was born on 28 September 1934 in the 15th arrondissement of Paris, to Louis Bardot (1896–1975) and Anne-Marie Mucel (1912–1978). Bardot's father, originated from Ligny-en-Barrois, was an engineer and the proprietor of several industrial factories in Paris. Her mother was the daughter of an insurance company director. She grew up in a conservative Catholic family, as had her father. She suffered from amblyopia as a child, which resulted in decreased vision of her left eye. She has one younger sister, Mijanou Bardot.

Bardot's childhood was prosperous; she lived in her family's seven-bedroom apartment in the luxurious 16th arrondissement. However, she recalled feeling resentful in her early years. Her father demanded that she follow strict behavioural standards, including good table manners, and wear appropriate clothes. Her mother was extremely selective in choosing companions for her, and as a result, Bardot had very few childhood friends. Bardot cited a personal traumatic incident when she and her sister broke her parents' favourite vase while they were playing in the house; her father whipped the sisters 20 times and henceforth treated them like "strangers", demanding them to address their parents by the pronoun "vous", which is a formal style of address, used when speaking to unfamiliar or higher-status persons outside the immediate family. The incident decisively led to Bardot resenting her parents, and to her future rebellious lifestyle.

During World War II, when Paris was occupied by Nazi Germany, Bardot spent more time at home due to increasingly strict civilian surveillance. She became engrossed in dancing to records, which her mother saw as a potential for a ballet career. Bardot was admitted at the age of seven to the private school Cours Hattemer. She went to school three days a week, which gave her ample time to take dance lessons at a local studio, under her mother's arrangements. In 1949, Bardot was accepted at the Conservatoire de Paris. For three years she attended ballet classes held by Russian choreographer Boris Knyazev. She also studied at the Institut de la Tour, a private Catholic high school near her home.

Hélène Gordon-Lazareff, the then-director of the magazines Elle and Le Jardin des Modes, hired Bardot in 1949 as a "junior" fashion model. On 8 March 1950, Bardot (aged 15 at the time) appeared on the cover of Elle, which brought her an acting offer for the film Les Lauriers sont coupés from director Marc Allégret. Her parents opposed her becoming an actress, but her grandfather was supportive, saying that "If this little girl is to become a whore, cinema will not be the cause." At the audition, Bardot met Roger Vadim, who later notified her that she did not get the role. They subsequently fell in love. Her parents fiercely opposed their relationship; her father announced to her one evening that she would continue her education in England and that he had bought her a train ticket, the journey to take place the following day. Bardot reacted by putting her head into an oven with open fire; her parents stopped her and ultimately accepted the relationship, on condition that she marry Vadim at the age of 18.

Career

Beginnings: 1952–1955

Bardot appeared on the cover of Elle again in 1952, which landed her a movie offer for the comedy Crazy for Love (1952), starring Bourvil and directed by Jean Boyer. She was paid 200,000 francs ( US dollars) for the small role portraying a cousin of the main character. Bardot had her second film role in Manina, the Girl in the Bikini (1953), directed by Willy Rozier. She also had roles in the films The Long Teeth and His Father's Portrait (both 1953).

Bardot had a small role in a Hollywood-financed film being shot in Paris, Act of Love (1953), starring Kirk Douglas. She received media attention when she attended the Cannes Film Festival in April 1953.

Bardot had a leading role in an Italian melodrama, Concert of Intrigue (1954) and in a French adventure film, Caroline and the Rebels (1954). She had a good part as a flirtatious student in School for Love (1955), opposite Jean Marais, for director Marc Allégret.

Bardot played her first sizeable English-language role in Doctor at Sea (1955), as the love interest for Dirk Bogarde. The film was the third-most-popular movie at the British box-office that year.

She had a small role in The Grand Maneuver (1955) for director René Clair, supporting Gérard Philipe and Michelle Morgan. The part was bigger in The Light Across the Street (1956) for director Georges Lacombe. She had another in the Hollywood film, Helen of Troy, playing Helen's handmaiden.

For the Italian movie Mio figlio Nerone (1956) Bardot was asked by the director to appear as a blonde. Rather than wear a wig to hide her naturally brunette hair she decided to dye her hair. She was so pleased with the results that she decided to retain the hair colour.

Rise to stardom: 1956–1962 

Bardot then appeared in four movies that made her a star. First up was a musical, Naughty Girl (1956), where Bardot played a troublesome school girl. Directed by Michel Boisrond, it was co-written by Roger Vadim and was a big hit, the 12th most popular film of the year in France. It was followed by a comedy, Plucking the Daisy (1956), written by Vadim with the director Marc Allégret, and another success in France. So too was the comedy The Bride Is Much Too Beautiful (1956) with Louis Jourdan.

Finally there was the melodrama And God Created Woman (1956), Vadim's debut as director, with Bardot starring opposite Jean-Louis Trintignant and Curt Jurgens. The film, about an immoral teenager in a respectable small-town setting, was a huge success, not just in France but also around the world – it was among the ten most popular films in Britain in 1957. It turned Bardot into an international star. From at least 1956, she was being hailed as the "sex kitten". The film scandalized the United States and theatre managers were arrested for screening it.

During her early career, professional photographer Sam Lévin's photos contributed to the image of Bardot's sensuality. One showed Bardot from behind, dressed in a white corset. British photographer Cornel Lucas made images of Bardot in the 1950s and 1960s that have become representative of her public persona.

Bardot followed And God Created Woman with La Parisienne (1957), a comedy co-starring Charles Boyer for director Boisrond. She was reunited with Vadim in another melodrama The Night Heaven Fell (1958) and played a criminal who seduced Jean Gabin in In Case of Adversity (1958). The latter was the 13th most seen movie of the year in France. In 1958, Bardot became the highest-paid French actress.

The Female (1959) for director Julien Duvivier was popular, but Babette Goes to War (1959), a comedy set in World War II, was a huge hit, the fourth biggest movie of the year in France. Also widely seen was Come Dance with Me (1959) from Boisrond.

Her next film was the courtroom drama The Truth (1960), from Henri-Georges Clouzot. It was a highly publicised production, which resulted in Bardot having an affair and attempting suicide. The film was Bardot's biggest commercial success in France, the third biggest hit of the year, and was nominated for the Academy Award for Best Foreign Film. Bardot was awarded a David di Donatello Award for Best Foreign Actress for her role in the film.

She made a comedy with Vadim, Please, Not Now! (1961), and had a role in the all-star anthology, Famous Love Affairs (1962).

Bardot starred alongside Marcello Mastroianni in a film inspired by her life in A Very Private Affair (Vie privée, 1962), directed by Louis Malle. More popular in France was Love on a Pillow (1962), another for Vadim.

International films and singing career: 1962–1968 

In the mid-1960s, Bardot made films that seemed to be more aimed at the international market. She starred in Jean-Luc Godard's film Le Mépris (1963), produced by Joseph E. Levine and starring Jack Palance. The following year she co-starred with Anthony Perkins in the comedy Une ravissante idiote (1964).

Dear Brigitte (1965), Bardot's first Hollywood film, was a comedy starring James Stewart as an academic whose son develops a crush on Bardot. Bardot's appearance was relatively brief and the film was not a big hit.

More successful was the Western buddy comedy Viva Maria! (1965) for director Louis Malle, appearing opposite Jeanne Moreau. It was a big hit in France and worldwide, although it did not break through in the US as much as it had been hoped.

After a cameo in Godard's Masculin Féminin (1966), she had her first outright flop for some years, Two Weeks in September (1968), a French–English co-production. She had a small role in the all-star Spirits of the Dead (1968), acting opposite Alain Delon, then tried a Hollywood film again: Shalako (1968), a Western starring Sean Connery, which was a box-office disappointment.

She participated in several musical shows and recorded many popular songs in the 1960s and 1970s, mostly in collaboration with Serge Gainsbourg, Bob Zagury and Sacha Distel, including "Harley Davidson"; "Je Me Donne À Qui Me Plaît"; "Bubble gum"; "Contact"; "Je Reviendrai Toujours Vers Toi"; "L'Appareil À Sous"; "La Madrague"; "On Déménage"; "Sidonie"; "Tu Veux, Ou Tu Veux Pas?"; "Le Soleil De Ma Vie" (a cover of Stevie Wonder's "You Are the Sunshine of My Life"); and "Je t'aime... moi non-plus". Bardot pleaded with Gainsbourg not to release this duet and he complied with her wish; the following year, he rerecorded a version with British-born model and actress Jane Birkin that became a massive hit all over Europe. The version with Bardot was issued in 1986 and became a download hit in 2006 when Universal Music made its back catalogue available to purchase online, with this version of the song ranking as the third most popular download.

Final films: 1969–1973 
From 1969 to 1978, Bardot was the official face of Marianne (who had previously been anonymous) to represent the liberty of France.

Les Femmes (1969) was a flop, although the screwball comedy The Bear and the Doll (1970) performed better. Her last few films were mostly comedies: Les Novices (1970), Boulevard du Rhum (1971) (with Lino Ventura). The Legend of Frenchie King (1971) was more popular, helped by Bardot co-starring with Claudia Cardinale.

She made one more with Vadim, Don Juan, or If Don Juan Were a Woman (1973), playing the title role. Vadim said the film marked "Underneath what people call 'the Bardot myth' was something interesting, even though she was never considered the most professional actress in the world. For years, since she has been growing older, and the Bardot myth has become just a souvenir... I was curious in her as a woman and I had to get to the end of something with her, to get out of her and express many things I felt were in her. Brigitte always gave the impression of sexual freedom – she is a completely open and free person, without any aggression. So I gave her the part of a man – that amused me".

"If Don Juan is not my last movie it will be my next to last", said Bardot during filming. She kept her word and only made one more film, The Edifying and Joyous Story of Colinot (1973).

In 1973, Bardot announced she was retiring from acting as "a way to get out elegantly".

Animal rights activism
After appearing in more than 40 motion pictures and recording several music albums, Bardot used her fame to promote animal rights.

In 1986, she established the Brigitte Bardot Foundation for the Welfare and Protection of Animals. She became a vegetarian and raised three million francs ( US dollars) to fund the foundation by auctioning off jewellery and personal belongings.

She once had a neighbour's donkey castrated while looking after it, on the grounds of its "sexual harassment" of her own donkey and mare, for which she was taken to court by the donkey's owner in 1989. Bardot wrote a 1999 letter to Chinese President Jiang Zemin, published in French magazine VSD, in which she accused the Chinese of "torturing bears and killing the world's last tigers and rhinos to make aphrodisiacs".

She has donated more than $140,000 over two years for a mass sterilization and adoption program for Bucharest's stray dogs, estimated to number 300,000.

Bardot is a strong animal rights activist and a major opponent of the consumption of horse meat. In support of animal protection, she condemned seal hunting in Canada during a visit to that country with Paul Watson of the Sea Shepherd Conservation Society. In August 2010, Bardot addressed a letter to the Queen of Denmark, Margarethe II, appealing for the sovereign to halt the killing of dolphins in the Faroe Islands. In the letter, Bardot describes the activity as a "macabre spectacle" that "is a shame for Denmark and the Faroe Islands ... This is not a hunt but a mass slaughter ... an outmoded tradition that has no acceptable justification in today's world".

On 22 April 2011, French culture minister Frédéric Mitterrand officially included bullfighting in the country's cultural heritage. Bardot wrote him a highly critical letter of protest. On 25 May 2011, the Sea Shepherd Conservation Society renamed its fast interceptor vessel, MV Gojira, as MV Brigitte Bardot in appreciation of her support.

From 2013 onwards, the Brigitte Bardot Foundation in collaboration with Kagyupa International Monlam Trust of India has operated an annual veterinary care camp. She has committed to the cause of animal welfare in Bodhgaya year after year.

On 23 July 2015, Bardot condemned Australian politician Greg Hunt's plan to eradicate 2 million cats to save endangered species such as the Warru and night parrot.

Personal life

Marriages and relationships
Throughout her life, Bardot had seventeen relationships with men and was married four times. Bardot was leaving for another relationship when "the present was getting lukewarm"; she said, "I have always looked for passion. That's why I was often unfaithful. And when the passion was coming to an end, I was packing my suitcase".

On 20 December 1952, aged 18, Bardot married director Roger Vadim. In 1956, she had become romantically involved with Jean-Louis Trintignant, who was her co-star in And God Created Woman. Trintignant at the time was married to actress Stéphane Audran. Bardot and Vadim divorced in 1957; they had no children together, but remained in touch, and even collaborated on later projects. The stated reason for the divorce was Bardot's affairs with two other men. Bardot and Trintignant lived together for about two years, spanning the period before and after Bardot's divorce from Vadim, but they never married. Their relationship was complicated by Trintignant's frequent absence due to military service and Bardot's affair with musician Gilbert Bécaud.

After her separation from Vadim, Bardot acquired a historic property dating from the 16th century, called Le Castelet, in Cannes. The fourteen-bedroom villa, surrounded by lush gardens, olive trees, and vineyards, consisted of several buildings.

In 1958, she bought a second property called La Madrague, located in Saint-Tropez. In early 1958, her break-up with Trintignant was followed in quick order by a reported nervous breakdown in Italy, according to newspaper reports. A suicide attempt with sleeping pills two days earlier was also noted but was denied by her public relations manager. She recovered within weeks and began a relationship with actor Jacques Charrier. She became pregnant well before they were married on 18 June 1959. Bardot's only child, her son Nicolas-Jacques Charrier, was born on 11 January 1960. Bardot had an affair with Glenn Ford in the early 1960s. After she and Charrier divorced in 1962, Nicolas was raised in the Charrier family and had little contact with his biological mother until his adulthood. Sami Frey was mentioned as the reason for her divorce from Charrier. Bardot was enamoured of Frey, but he quickly left her.
 
From 1963 to 1965, she lived with musician Bob Zagury.

Bardot's third marriage was to German millionaire playboy Gunter Sachs, lasting from 14 July 1966 to 7 October 1969, though they had separated the previous year. As she was on the set of Shalako, she had rejected Sean Connery's advances; she said, "It didn't last long because I wasn't a James Bond girl! I have never succumbed to his charm!" In 1968, she began dating Patrick Gilles, who co-starred with her in The Bear and the Doll (1970); but she ended their relationship in spring 1971.

Over the next few years, Bardot dated in succession bartender/ski instructor Christian Kalt, club owner Luigi Rizzi, singer Serge Gainsbourg, writer John Gilmore, actor Warren Beatty, and Laurent Vergez, her co-star in Don Juan, or If Don Juan Were a Woman.

In 1974, Bardot appeared in a nude photo shoot in Playboy magazine, which celebrated her 40th birthday. In 1975, she entered a relationship with artist Miroslav Brozek and posed for some of his sculptures. The couple lived together at La Madrague. They separated in December 1979.

From 1980 to 1985, Bardot had a live-in relationship with French TV producer . On 28 September 1983, her 49th birthday, Bardot took an overdose of sleeping pills or tranquilizers with red wine. She had to be rushed to the hospital, where her life was saved after a stomach pump was used to evacuate the pills from her body. Bardot was diagnosed with breast cancer in 1984. She refused to undergo chemotherapy treatment and decided only to do radiation therapy. She recovered in 1986.

Bardot's fourth and current husband is Bernard d'Ormale; they have been married since 16 August 1992. In 2018, in an interview accorded to Le Journal du Dimanche, she denied rumors of relationships with Johnny Hallyday, Jimi Hendrix, and Mick Jagger.

Politics and legal issues
Bardot expressed support for President Charles de Gaulle in the 1960s.

In her 1999 book Le Carré de Pluton (Pluto's Square), Bardot criticizes the procedure used in the ritual slaughter of sheep during the Muslim festival of Eid al-Adha. Additionally, in a section in the book entitled "Open Letter to My Lost France", she writes that "my country, France, my homeland, my land is again invaded by an overpopulation of foreigners, especially Muslims". For this comment, a French court fined her 30,000 francs ( US dollars) in June 2000. She had been fined in 1997 for the original publication of this open letter in Le Figaro and again in 1998 for making similar remarks.

In her 2003 book, Un cri dans le silence (A Scream in the Silence), she contrasted her close gay friends with homosexuals who "jiggle their bottoms, put their little fingers in the air and with their little castrato voices moan about what those ghastly heteros put them through," and said some contemporary homosexuals behave like "fairground freaks". In her own defence, Bardot wrote in a letter to a French gay magazine: "Apart from my husband — who maybe will cross over one day as well — I am entirely surrounded by homos. For years, they have been my support, my friends, my adopted children, my confidants."

In her book, she addressed issues such as racial mixing, immigration, the role of women in politics and the religion of Islam. The book also contained a section attacking what she called the mixing of genes and praised previous generations who, she said, had given their lives to push out invaders. On 10 June 2004, Bardot was convicted for a fourth time by a French court for inciting racial hatred and fined €5,000 ( US dollars). Bardot denied the racial hatred charge and apologized in court, saying: "I never knowingly wanted to hurt anybody. It is not in my character." In 2008, Bardot was convicted of inciting racial/religious hatred in regard to a letter she wrote, a copy of which she sent to Nicolas Sarkozy when he was Interior Minister of France. The letter stated her objections to Muslims in France ritually slaughtering sheep by slitting their throats without anesthetizing them first. She also said, in reference to Muslims, that she was "fed up with being under the thumb of this population which is destroying us, destroying our country and imposing its habits". The trial concluded on 3 June 2008, with a conviction and fine of €15,000 ( US dollars). The prosecutor stated she was weary of charging Bardot with offences related to racial hatred.

During the 2008 United States presidential election, Bardot branded Republican Party vice-presidential candidate Sarah Palin as "stupid" and a "disgrace to women". She criticized the former Alaskan governor for her stance on global warming and gun control. She was further offended by Palin's support for Arctic oil exploration and by her lack of consideration in protecting polar bears.

On 13 August 2010, Bardot criticised American filmmaker Kyle Newman for his plan to produce a biographical film about her. She told him, "Wait until I'm dead before you make a movie about my life!" otherwise "sparks will fly".

In 2014, Bardot wrote an open letter demanding the ban in France of shechita, describing it as "ritual sacrifice". In response, the European Jewish Congress released a statement saying “Bardot has once again shown her clear insensitivity for minority groups with the substance and style of her letter...She may well be concerned for the welfare of animals but her longstanding support for the far-Right and for discrimination against minorities in France shows a constant disdain for human rights instead.”

In 2015, Bardot threatened to sue a Saint-Tropez boutique selling items featuring her face. In 2018, Bardot expressed support for the yellow vests movement.

On 19 March 2019, Bardot issued an open letter to Réunion prefect  in which she accused inhabitants of the Indian Ocean island of animal cruelty and referred to them as "autochthonous who have kept the genes of savages". In her letter relating to animal abuse and sent through her foundation, she mentioned the "beheadings of goats and billy goats" during festivals, and associated these practices with "reminiscences of cannibalism from past centuries". The public prosecutor filed a lawsuit the following day.

In June 2021, eighty-six-year-old Bardot was fined €5,000 ( US dollars) by the Arras court for public insults against the hunters and their national president . Initially, she had published a post at the end of 2019 on her foundation's website, calling hunters "sub-men" and "drunkards" and carriers of "genes of cruel barbarism inherited from our primitive ancestors". Schraen was also insulted. At the time of the hearing, she had not removed the comments from the website. Following her letter sent to the prefect of Réunion in 2019, she was convicted on 4 November 2021 by a French court for public insults and fined €20,000 ( US dollars), the largest of her fines to date.

Bardot's husband Bernard d'Ormale is a former adviser to Jean-Marie Le Pen, former leader of the far-right party National Front (now National Rally), the main far-right party in France, known for its nationalist beliefs. Bardot expressed support for Marine Le Pen, leader of the National Front (National Rally), calling her "the Joan of Arc of the 21st century". She endorsed Le Pen in the 2012 and 2017 French presidential elections.

Legacy

The Guardian named Bardot "one of the most iconic faces, models, and actors of the 1950s and 1960s". She has been called a "style icon" and a "muse for Dior, Balmain, and Pierre Cardin".

In fashion, the Bardot neckline (a wide-open neck that exposes both shoulders) is named after her. Bardot popularized this style which is especially used for knitted sweaters or jumpers although it is also used for other tops and dresses. Bardot popularized the bikini in her early films such as Manina (1952) (released in France as Manina, la fille sans voiles). The following year she was also photographed in a bikini on every beach in the south of France during the Cannes Film Festival. She gained additional attention when she filmed ...And God Created Woman (1956) with Jean-Louis Trintignant (released in France as Et Dieu Créa La Femme). In it Bardot portrays an immoral teenager cavorting in a bikini who seduces men in a respectable small-town setting. The film was an international success. Bardot's image was linked to the shoemaker Repetto, who created a pair of ballerinas for her in 1956. The bikini was in the 1950s relatively well accepted in France but was still considered risqué in the United States. As late as 1959, Anne Cole, one of the United States' largest swimsuit designers, said, "It's nothing more than a G-string. It's at the razor's edge of decency."

She also brought into fashion the choucroute ("Sauerkraut") hairstyle (a sort of beehive hair style) and gingham clothes after wearing a checkered pink dress, designed by Jacques Esterel, at her wedding to Charrier. She was the subject of an Andy Warhol painting.

Isabella Biedenharn of Elle wrote that Bardot "has inspired thousands (millions?) of women to tease their hair or try out winged eyeliner over the past few decades". A well-known evocative pose describes an iconic modelling portrait shot around 1960 where Bardot is dressed only in a pair of black pantyhose, cross-legged over her front and cross-armed over her breasts. This pose has been emulated numerous times by models and celebrities such as Lindsay Lohan, Elle Macpherson, Gisele Bündchen, and Rihanna. In the late 1960s, Bardot's silhouette was used as a model for designing and modelling the statue's bust of Marianne, a symbol of the French Republic.

In addition to popularizing the bikini swimming suit, Bardot has been credited with popularizing the city of St. Tropez and the town of Armação dos Búzios in Brazil, which she visited in 1964 with her boyfriend at the time, Brazilian musician Bob Zagury. The place where she stayed in Búzios is today a small hotel, Pousada do Sol, and also a French restaurant, Cigalon. The town hosts a Bardot statue by Christina Motta.

Bardot was idolized by the young John Lennon and Paul McCartney. They made plans to shoot a film featuring The Beatles and Bardot, similar to A Hard Day's Night, but the plans were never fulfilled. Lennon's first wife Cynthia Powell lightened her hair colour to more closely resemble Bardot, while George Harrison made comparisons between Bardot and his first wife Pattie Boyd, as Cynthia wrote later in A Twist of Lennon. Lennon and Bardot met in person once, in 1968 at the May Fair Hotel, introduced by Beatles press agent Derek Taylor; a nervous Lennon took LSD before arriving, and neither star impressed the other. Lennon recalled in a memoir: "I was on acid, and she was on her way out." According to the liner notes of his first (self-titled) album, musician Bob Dylan dedicated the first song he ever wrote to Bardot. He also mentioned her by name in "I Shall Be Free", which appeared on his second album, The Freewheelin' Bob Dylan. The first-ever official exhibition spotlighting Bardot's influence and legacy opened in Boulogne-Billancourt on 29 September 2009 – a day after her 75th birthday. The Australian pop group Bardot was named after her.

Women who emulated and were inspired by Bardot include Claudia Schiffer, Emmanuelle Béart, Elke Sommer, Kate Moss, Faith Hill, Isabelle Adjani, Diane Kruger, Lara Stone, Kylie Minogue, Amy Winehouse, Georgia May Jagger, Zahia Dehar, Scarlett Johansson, Louise Bourgoin, and Paris Hilton. Bardot said: "None have my personality." Laetitia Casta embodied Bardot in the 2010 French drama film Gainsbourg: A Heroic Life by Joann Sfar.

In 2011, Los Angeles Times Magazines list of "50 Most Beautiful Women In Film" ranked her number two.

Bardot inspired Nicole Kidman to promote the 2013 campaign shoot of the British brand Jimmy Choo.

In 2015, Bardot was ranked number six in "The Top Ten Most Beautiful Women Of All Time", according to a survey carried out by Amway's beauty company in the UK which involved 2,000 women.

In 2020, Vogue named Bardot number one of "The most beautiful French actresses of all time". In a retrospective retracing women throughout the history of cinema, she was listed among "the most accomplished, talented and beautiful actresses of all time" by Glamour.

The French drama television series Bardot is scheduled to be broadcast on France 2 in 2023. It stars Julia de Nunez and is about Bardot's career from her first casting at age 15 and until the filming of La Vérité ten years later.

Filmography

Discography

Studio albums

Other notable singles

Books
Bardot has also written five books:
 Noonoah: Le petit phoque blanc (Grasset, 1978)
 Initiales B.B. (autobiography, Grasset & Fasquelle, 1996)
 Le Carré de Pluton (Grasset & Fasquelle, 1999)
 Un Cri Dans Le Silence (Editions Du Rocher, 2003)
 Pourquoi? (Editions Du Rocher, 2006)

Accolades

Awards and nominations
12th Victoires du cinéma français (French cinema victories) (1957): Best Actress, win, as Juliette Hardy in And God Created Woman.
11th Bambi Awards (1958): Best Actress, nomination,  as Juliette Hardy in And God Created Woman.
14th Victoires du cinéma français (1959):  Best Actress, win, as Yvette Maudet in In Case of Adversity.
Brussels European Awards (1960):  Best Actress, win, as Dominique Marceau in The Truth.
5th David di Donatello Awards  (1961): Best Foreign Actress, win, as Dominique Marceau in The Truth.
12th Étoiles de cristal (Crystal stars) by the French Cinema Academy (1966): Best Actress, win, as Marie Fitzgerald O'Malley in Viva Maria!.
18th Bambi Awards (1967): Bambi Award of Popularity, win. 
20th BAFTA Awards (1967): BAFTA Award for Best Foreign Actress, nomination, as Marie Fitzgerald O'Malley in Viva Maria!.

Honours
1980: Medal of the City of Trieste.
1985: Legion of Honour. Medal of the City of Lille.
1989: Peace Prize in humanitarian merit.
1992: Induction into the United Nations Environment Programme's Global 500 Roll of Honour. Creation in Hollywood of the Brigitte Bardot International Award as part of the Genesis Awards.
1994: Medal of the City of Paris. 
1995: Medal of the City of Saint-Tropez. 
1996: Medal of the City of La Baule.
1997: Greece's UNESCO Ecology Award. Medal of the City of Athens.
1999: Asteroid 17062 Bardot was named after her.
2001: PETA Humanitarian Award.
2008: Spanish Altarriba foundation Award.
2019: GAIA Lifetime Achievement Award from the Belgian association for the defence of animal rights.
2021: Her effigy in Saint-Tropez was dressed in 1400 gold leaves of 23.75 carats each.

See also
 List of animal rights advocates

Notes

References

Other sources

Literature
 Brigitte Tast, Hans-Jürgen Tast (Hrsg.) Brigitte Bardot. Filme 1953–1961. Anfänge des Mythos B.B. (Hildesheim 1982) .

External links

 
 

 
1934 births
Actresses from Paris
Christian critics of Islam
French animal rights activists
Female critics of feminism
French critics of Islam
French activists
French women activists
French female models
French women singers
French film actresses
French Roman Catholics
Légion d'honneur refusals
Living people
MGM Records artists
20th-century French actresses
David di Donatello winners
People convicted of racial hatred offences
Anti-immigration politics in Europe